The Combin de la Tsessette is the third highest summit in the Grand Combin massif. It lies east of the Grand Combin summit (Combin de Grafeneire) and overlooks the Lac de Mauvoisin.

First known ascent by E.F.M.Benecke and H.A.Cohen on 21 July 1894.

See also

List of 4000 metre peaks of the Alps

References

Alpine four-thousanders
Mountains of the Alps
Mountains of Valais
Pennine Alps
Mountains of Switzerland
Four-thousanders of Switzerland